James Moles (1884 – 7 November 1915) was an English professional footballer who played in the Football League for Birmingham as a left half. His style of play was described as "aggressive".

Career 
Moles played for Southern League clubs Tottenham Hotspur and Leyton, before joining Second Division club Birmingham in 1909, as cover for Frank Buckley. He made his debut in a 2–2 home draw with Glossop on 13 September 1909, replacing Buckley as the team's centre half. In the second half of the 1909–10 season, he played regularly in his preferred position of left half. Moles' aggressive style cost him his place and he returned to London local football in 1911.

Personal life 
Moles gave a false age when he attested in the Militia in February 1900 and was discharged after 48 days. Moles served as a lance corporal in the Middlesex Regiment during the First World War and died of wounds at No. 9 Casualty Clearing Station, Lillers on 7 November 1915. He was buried in Lillers Communal Cemetery.

Career statistics

References

1884 births
1915 deaths
Footballers from Tottenham
English footballers
Association football wing halves
Tottenham Hotspur F.C. players
Leyton F.C. players
Birmingham City F.C. players
Southern Football League players
English Football League players
British Army personnel of World War I
Middlesex Regiment soldiers
British military personnel killed in World War I
Rotherham Town F.C. (1899) players
Date of birth unknown